The 2014 Garanti Koza WTA Tournament of Champions was a singles-only tennis tournament played from October 28 to November 2, 2014, on an indoor hard court. It was won by Andrea Petkovic. For the second year of a two-year deal, the tournament by Turkish construction firm Garanti Koza. This was the sixth edition of the tournament as part of the 2014 WTA Tour as well as the third and last held at Arena Armeec in Sofia, Bulgaria. Defending champion Simona Halep did not take part since she qualified for the 2014 WTA Finals.

Participants and format
The tournament was the season ending event for players who had won one of the WTA International tournaments but had not qualified for the WTA Championships. It consisted of a singles draw of eight players including two wild cards in a round robin format, split into two groups of four. Over the first four days of competition, each player met the other three players in their group, with the top two in each group advancing to the semifinals. The first-placed player in one group met the second-placed player in the other group, and vice versa. The winners of each semifinal met in the championship match.

Round robin tie-breaking methods

The final standings of each group was determined by the first of the following methods that apply:
 Greatest number of wins
 Greatest number of matches played; or
 Head-to-head results if only two players are tied, or if three players are tied then:
a If three players each have the same number of wins, a player having played less than all three matches is automatically eliminated and the player advancing to the single elimination competition is the winner of the match-up of the two remaining tied players; or
b Highest percentage of sets won; or
c Highest percentage of games won

Prize money and points
The total prize money for the 2014 Garanti Koza WTA Tournament of Champions was 750,000 United States dollars.

1 for every match played in the round robin stage, a player got 25 points, and for each round robin win a player got 35 additional points.
2 RR means prize money or points won during round robin play.
3 Alternates received $7,500 in prize money, even if they did not play.

2014 WTA International tournaments champions

Participants
The six highest-ranked players who had captured at least one International tournament during the year and who were not participating in singles at the year-end WTA Finals in Singapore.  Players with a purple colour qualified for the 2014 WTA Finals. The two wildcards were first awarded to Tsvetana Pironkova and Jelena Janković. On 11 October, Jankovic withdrew from the tournament and the wild card went to Flavia Pennetta. On 23 October, Samantha Stosur withdrew due to a foot injury and her place went to Garbiñe Muguruza.

Champions

Singles

  Andrea Petkovic def.  Flavia Pennetta, 1–6, 6–4, 6–3

See also
WTA Tournament of Champions
2014 WTA Tour
2014 WTA Finals

References

External links
Official website

Garanti Koza WTA Tournament of Champions
WTA Tournament of Champions
Tennis tournaments in Bulgaria
Sports competitions in Sofia
2014 in Bulgarian sport